Podgozd is a small settlement northwest of Trnovo in the Municipality of Nova Gorica in western Slovenia.

References

External links
Podgozd on Geopedia

Populated places in the City Municipality of Nova Gorica